The 70th Infantry Regiment was a Regular Army infantry regiment in the United States Army.

It was constituted 9 July 1918 in the Regular Army as the 70th Infantry. Assigned to the 10th Infantry Division. Organized 10 August 1918 at Camp Funston, Kansas. from personnel of the 20th Infantry. Relieved from the 10th Division and demobilized 13 February 1919 at Camp Funston.

References

 Encyclopedia of United States Army insignia and uniforms By William K. Emerson (page 51).

External links
 http://www.history.army.mil/html/forcestruc/lineages/branches/inf/default.htm
 http://www.angelfire.com/ny5/msgfisher/ww1pic.htm

070
Military units and formations established in 1918
Military units and formations disestablished in 1919